"Mandatory Brunch Meeting" is the seventeenth episode of the fourth season and 83rd episode overall from the Fox series Gotham. The show itself is based on the characters created by DC Comics set in the Batman mythology. Written by co-executive producers Steven Lilien & Bryan Wynbrandt and directed by Maja Vrvilo, it was first broadcast on April 5, 2018. The episode is notable for introducing the character Jeremiah Valeska, who becomes a major antagonist in the series going forward.

In the episode, Gordon and Bullock attempt to track down Jerome Valeska, who has assembled a legion of criminals to wreak havoc in Gotham and is looking for "Xander Wilde", an engineer with whom he shared a dark past with. Meanwhile, Lee faces Nygma off on a riddling contest in order to solve a conflict.

The episode received critical acclaim, with critics lauding Monaghan’s performances as Jerome and Jeremiah and the introduction of the latter.

Plot
Bruce (David Mazouz) arrives at St. Ignatius, the school that Jerome's (Cameron Monaghan) next target, "Xander Wilde", attended. The Headmaster (Steven Hauck) reveals that he has already given information regarding Wilde to Jerome before committing suicide under hypnosis.

Jerome holds a meeting with Cobblepot (Robin Lord Taylor), Tetch (Benedict Samuel), Fries (Nathan Darrow), Pike (Michelle Veintimilla), and Crane (David W. Thompson). He reveals his plans to wreak havoc in the city before invading Wilde's engineering offices in search of him. Jerome arrives at Wilde's proxy's apartment but is knocked unconscious, and subsequently wakes up in a cell with Wilde watching him via CCTV cameras. Gordon (Ben McKenzie) and Bullock (Donal Logue) arrive at the control room in the underground facility and confront Wilde, who looks exactly like Jerome. Wilde is revealed to be Jeremiah Valeska (also played by Monaghan), Jerome's twin brother. Jeremiah claims to have suffered severe abuse at Jerome's hands throughout his childhood, forcing their mother to send Jeremiah away to be adopted and renamed "Xander Wilde". Jerome's allies arrive and free Jerome, who vows to drive Jeremiah mad.

Lee (Morena Baccarin) challenges Nygma (Cory Michael Smith) to his game, the Riddle Factory, and wagers to abolish it if she wins. After she outsmarts Nygma, the two share a kiss. Jeremiah is placed into protective custody with the help of GCPD. Cobblepot recruits Grundy (Drew Powell) for the Legion. Jerome brings a man and has Crane infect him with toxic laughing gas, intending to spread it throughout the city.

Production

Development
In March 2018, it was announced that the seventeenth episode of the season would be titled "Mandatory Brunch Meeting" and was to be written by Steven Lilien & Bryan Wynbrandt and directed by Maja Vrvilo.

Casting
Erin Richards, Camren Bicondova, Chris Chalk, Crystal Reed, and Alexander Siddig don't appear in the episode as their respective characters. In March 2018, it was announced that the guest cast for the episode would include David W. Thompson as Jonathan Crane, Benedict Samuel as Jervis Tetch, Cameron Monaghan as Jerome Valeska, Michelle Veintimilla as Firefly, Nathan Darrow as Mr. Freeze, and Steven Hauck as Headmaster.

Reception

Viewers
The episode was watched by 2.53 million viewers with a 0.7/3 share among adults aged 18 to 49. This was a slight increase in viewership from the previous episode, which was watched by 2.39 million viewers with a 0.7/3 in the 18-49 demographics. With these ratings, Gotham ranked first for Fox, beating Showtime at the Apollo, fourth on its timeslot, and twelfth for the night, behind S.W.A.T., Scandal, Superstore, Life in Pieces, Will & Grace, Chicago Fire, Station 19, Mom, Grey's Anatomy, Young Sheldon, and The Big Bang Theory.

With DVR factored in, the episode was viewed by 3.96 million viewers with a 1.3 in the 18-49 demo.

References

External links 
 

2018 American television episodes
Gotham (season 4) episodes